Dongmen Subdistrict may refer to:

 Dongmen Subdistrict, Chuzhou, in Langya District, Chuzhou, Anhui
 Dongmen Subdistrict, Anhui, in Jinghu District, Wuhu, Anhui
 Dongmen Subdistrict, Wuhu, in Jinghu District, Wuhu, Anhui
 Dongmen Subdistrict, Shenzhen, in Luohu District, Shenzhen, Guangdong
 Dongmen Subdistrict, Guixi, in Guixi, Jiangxi

See also
 Dongmen (disambiguation)